Robert E. Sweeney (November 4, 1924 – June 30, 2007) was a U.S. Representative from Ohio and a son of another former Representative, Martin L. Sweeney.

Early life
Sweeney was born in the West Park neighborhood of Cleveland, Ohio and graduated from that city's Saint Ignatius High School.

He attended Georgetown University in Washington, D.C.; Baldwin-Wallace College in Berea, Ohio; and Cleveland-Marshall Law School in Cleveland, where he studied law despite the discouragement of his father.

Sweeney joined the Army during World War II and served from 1943 until 1946.

In 1951, Sweeney was admitted to the bar and began practicing law in Cleveland, Ohio. During his early law career, he served as the assistant director of law for Cleveland from 1951 until 1954. He later served as a special to the Attorney General of Ohio from 1958 until 1962.

Political career
Sweeney was the Democratic nominee for Attorney General of Ohio in 1962 but was defeated in the general election that November.

Sweeney was elected as a Democrat in 1964 to an at-large seat to the United States House of Representatives. He served just one term, the Eighty-ninth Congress, January 3, 1965 – January 3, 1967.

After Ohio switched to electing members of Congress by districts beginning in 1966, Sweeney decided to forgo a re-election bid and sought the Attorney General's office an additional time. As in 1962, he won the Democratic nomination but fell short in November. He then resumed the practice of law.

Sweeney was appointed in 1976 to an unexpired term on the Cuyahoga County Commission. He was subsequently elected to a full term in 1977. In 1980, he lost his seat on the commission after losing his bid for re-election.

During his tenure as a county commissioner, he was a supporter of regional government, helped establish Cuyahoga's public defender's office and the solid-waste district. He also was a primary advocate for the renovation of the Playhouse Square Center.

Later life and death

Sweeney was one of the first lawyers to bring forward a lawsuit related to asbestos. During his research, he discovered an incriminating document that showed that the manufacturers of asbestos had been aware of its dangers for half a century but conspired to conceal the information from the public. As a result of large settlements from the asbestos manufacturers, he would  go on to earn millions of dollars.

Sweeney was instrumental in the placement of the so-called "Irish plank" into the Democratic platform at the 1992 Democratic National Convention.

Sweeney's health sharply declined after suffering a major heart attack in 1999.

Sweeney died at the age of 82 on June 30, 2007, at his home in Gates Mills, Ohio, a Cleveland suburb, after suffering  from a variety of ailments. He is survived by his second wife, Kathryn; his first wife Patricia and their 13 children, Robert, Daniel, William, Martin, John, James, Thomas, Mary Brigid, Alice Marie, Edward, Patrica, Eileen and Catherine; 37 grandchildren, and 15 great-grandchildren; and two stepchildren from his second marriage.

External links

Obituary from The Cleveland Plain Dealer

1924 births
2007 deaths
Cleveland–Marshall College of Law alumni
Georgetown University alumni
Politicians from Cleveland
Baldwin Wallace University alumni
United States Army personnel of World War II
United States Army soldiers
Burials in Calvary Cemetery (Cleveland)
20th-century American politicians
People from Gates Mills, Ohio
Democratic Party members of the United States House of Representatives from Ohio